Arend Steenbergen (born 27 March 1965 in Nimègue), is a Dutch director and screenwriter.

Awards 

 2014: Film Award of the City of Utrecht for Twee dromen

Filmography 
 1993 : 
 1998 : Temmink: The Ultimate Fight
 2000 : 
 2004 : 
 2004 : 
 2005 : Zwarte zwanen
 2006 : Don
 2008 : Grandma's House
 2010 :

References

External links 
 

1965 births
Living people
Dutch film directors
Dutch screenwriters